Isanesvara Siva Temple is a 13th-century ad temple in Bhubaneswar in the state of Orissa, India. The time period of its construction is estimated from its architectural features and it is suggests the temple to ganga period. Isanesvara Siva temple is in the Goasagaresvartemple precinct, on the left side of Ratha road (leading from Mausima Chowk to Badheibanka Chowk) old Town, Bhubaneswar. The temple is facing towards east. The presiding deity is only a circular yon pitha. The lingam is missing.

This temple is used for worship. Its cultural, social and historical significances are same as the Gosagaresvara temple. Its associational significance is its usage for public meeting.

Ownership 
This temple has multiple ownership and It is taken care by private persons namely Mahendra Garabadu and Bhaga Garabadu. Their residence is at Gosagaresvar Chowk, Old Town,
Bhubaneswar.

Physical description

Surrounding
The temple is surrounded by Paradaresvara temple in the west, Gosagaresvara temple in north-west and minor Siva temple in the south-west, Lingarajaa Mandapa in the northern side, and in the eastern side there is a modern compound and across wall there is a paddy field.

Orientation
The temple is facing towards east.

Plan and elevation
On plan, temple is pancharatha having a square vimana with a renovated frontal porch extending towards east. On elevation, the vimana is in rekha order with usual bada, gandi and mastaka measures  in height from khura to kalasa. It is curvilinear spire. The mastaka has components like beki, amlaka. khapuri and kalasa that measures  in height.

Raha niche & Parsvadevatas
Beneath the niches is the plain talagarvika while above the niches is in the urdhvagarvika.

Decorative feature
The base of the gandi above the baranda decorated with a series of miniature rekha deuls surmounted by udyota simha in each raha paga.

Doorjamb: The doorjamb is of recent addition made out of the renovation work and beneath the door frame there are two khakhara-mundi niches are found.

Lintel: The graha architrave is plain due to renovation.

Property type
The temple has the Rekha deul typology and it is a temple building.

Building material: Coarse grained sandstone.

Construction techniques: Dry masonry.

Style Kalinga architecture

Grade (A/B/C)
i) Architecture: B

ii) Historic: C

iii) Associational:' B

iv) Social/Cultural: B

References 

 Lesser Known Monuments of Bhubaneswar by Dr. Sadasiba Pradhan
 http://ignca.nic.in/asi_reports/orkhurda009.pdf

Hindu temples in Bhubaneswar
13th-century Hindu temples